Minggu Pagi (Indonesian for Sunday Morning) is an Indonesian general interest weekly newspaper published by the Yogyakarta-based Kedaulatan Rakyat Group. It began in 1948 as a magazine, switching to the tabloid format in the 1980s.

History
Minggu Pagi was established as a magazine in Yogyakarta on 7 December 1948 by M. Wonohito and H. Samawi; the former was the editor in chief of the newspaper Kedaulatan Rakyat. Afterwards, the magazine did not publish again until 1950. The issues published through early 1951 were listed as Volume 2. In April 1953 Minggu Pagi jumped from Volume 4 to Volume 6, thus bringing the number of volumes in-line with the years since the magazine was established.

During a period of hyperinflation in the early 1960s, Minggu Pagi ceased publication as a standalone magazine. It was reduced to eight pages and included as a supplemental with the newspaper Kedaulatan Rakyat; as a result, the magazine's subscribers were required to pay extra for the newspaper. As the economy improved in the 1970s, Minggu Pagi was again issued as a stand-alone publication. It ultimately migrated to the tabloid format in the 1980s.

In 1992 the United States Information Service described Minggu Pagi, which by then consisted of twelve pages, as one of the oldest extant press publications in Indonesia. At this time it was one of several media published by Kedaulatan Rakyat Group, together with the newspaper Kedaulatan Rakyat, the children's magazine Gatotkaca, and the Javanese-language magazine Mekar Sari.

Contents
In its early years, Minggu Pagi included articles on a variety of topics, including science, film, traditional culture, tourism, and sports. It also included space for literary works, primarily short stories. Among short story writers and other authors, the magazine was seen as providing an alternative space for publication, one accessible to those who had not yet been recognized by the Jakarta-based "rulers" of the Indonesian literary canon. Given this opportunity, as well as the honorariums paid to authors, Minggu Pagi soon became a popular medium in which local writers could publish their works.

In the 1950s, the Indonesian author  described Minggu Pagi as a "cesspool", a descriptor that the academic Will Derks characterises as "embracing the low status and insignificance [the magazine] might have had in the eyes of scholars and critics". Nevertheless, by 1988 more than four hundred writers had contributed their literary works to the magazine and its successor. These included Motinggo Busye, Satyagraha Hoerip, Rendra, Bakri Siregar, and Djamin, who published his novel Hilanglah Si Anak Hilang in Minggu Pagi between 1960 and 1961 on request of the editors.

In the 1990s, Minggu Pagi had a column on sexuality, "Liku-Lika Seksualitas", managed by a "Dr. Rosi". It also regularly featured information on miraculous healing, sacred sites, and invulnerability practices.

Explanatory notes

References

Works cited

 
 
 
 

Indonesian press
Newspapers published in Yogyakarta
Weekly newspapers
1948 establishments in Indonesia